Teiu is a commune in Argeș County, Muntenia, Romania. It is composed of two villages, Leșile and Teiu.

Natives
 Vladimir Streinu

References

Communes in Argeș County
Localities in Muntenia